Lisa Amati is an invertebrate paleontologist who has discovered new species of trilobites, naming one of her discoveries Kermiti for its resemblance to Kermit the Frog. She became New York State's Paleontologist in 2015 and as such curates the New York State Museum's palaeontology collection.

Career 
Amati was appointed New York State's paleontologist in June 2015 by the New York State Board of Regents, becoming the first woman in over 50 years to serve as New York State Paleontologist.

(Winifred Goldring was the first woman New York State Paleontologist and served in that role from 1939 to 1954.)  In this position Amati curates the New York State Museum's paleontology collection and conducts field and laboratory research focusing on 450 million year old Trilobites. For 11 years she served as a professor of geology at the State University of New York at Potsdam.

Her publications include co-authoring "Systematics and paleobiogeographic significance of the Upper Ordovician pterygometopine trilobite Achatella Delo,1935," (2016), Journal of Paleontology;  "The Upper Ordovician trilobite Raymondites Sinclair, 144 in North America," (2015), Journal of Paleontology; and authoring "Isoteline trilobites of the Viola Group (Ordovician: Oklahoma): systematics and stratigraphic occurrence" (2014).   Dr. Amati earned her B.S. in geology in 1997 from University of Wyoming, a M.S. in geology in 1999 from Kent State University  and a Ph.D. in geology in 2004 from the University of Oklahoma.

References 

American paleontologists
Year of birth missing (living people)
Living people
Women paleontologists
21st-century American biologists
21st-century American women scientists
University of Wyoming alumni
Kent State University alumni
University of Oklahoma alumni
State University of New York at Potsdam faculty
21st-century American geologists
Scientists from New York (state)